Belarus has participated in the Eurovision Song Contest 16 times since making its debut in . This remains Belarus' only top ten placement.

The European Broadcasting Union (EBU) announced that the Belarusian broadcaster BTRC would be suspended from the union effective June 2021, which will prevent Belarus from participating in further Eurovision events unless BTRC is reintegrated or another broadcaster takes its position.

History
Belarus entered the contest in the same year that semi-finals began to be used to determine who would compete in the final.

Alexander Rybak, the winner of the  contest representing , expressed an interest in composing an entry for his birth country Belarus. Rybak's song "Accent", performed by Milki, competed in the Belarusian national final for the  contest, placing fourth.

Belarus originally planned to participate in the  contest, and were set to perform in the first half of the first semi-final. On 9 March 2021, Galasy ZMesta was announced as the chosen entrant with the song "Ya nauchu tebya (I'll Teach You)". However, the entry was disqualified on 11 March, as it was decided by the EBU that the song was in violation of the contest's rules. Belarusian broadcaster BTRC was ordered to submit either a new version of the song or an entirely new song that is compliant with the rules, or face disqualification. On 26 March, BTRC submitted the song "Pesnya pro zaytsev (Song about hares)", also sung by Galasy ZMesta, as Belarus' new entry, however that song was also disqualified, again for the same reasons as their previous attempt, and Belarus was subsequently disqualified from the 2021 contest altogether.

On 28 May 2021, six days after the 2021 final, the EBU voted to suspend BTRC's membership. BTRC was given two weeks to respond before the suspension came into effect on 11 June, but there was no public response. The broadcaster was expelled from the EBU on 1 July, therefore losing the rights to broadcast and participate in the contest. It was subsequently stated that the expulsion would last for three years, however Belarus would have to re-apply for membership after it expires.

Participation overview

Related involvement

Heads of delegation

Commentators and spokespersons

Other shows

Photo gallery

See also 
 Belarus in the Junior Eurovision Song Contest
 Belarus in the Turkvision Song Contest

Notes

References

External links 
 EUROFEST.BY - Eurovision News in Belarus
 OGAE Belarus - Eurovision fan club. The member of OGAE International Network

 
Countries in the Eurovision Song Contest
Music competitions in Belarus